Nancy Louise Huston, OC  (born September 16, 1953) is a Canadian-born novelist and essayist who writes primarily in French and translates her own works into English.

Biography
Huston was born in Calgary, Alberta, Canada, the city in which she lived until age fifteen, at which time her family moved to Wilton, New Hampshire, where she attended High Mowing School. She studied at Sarah Lawrence College in New York City, where she was given the opportunity to spend a year of her studies in Paris. Arriving in Paris in 1973, Huston obtained a master's degree from the École des hautes études en sciences sociales, writing a thesis on swear words under the supervision of Roland Barthes.

After many years of marriage to Tzvetan Todorov, with whom she had two children, Huston now shares her life with Swiss painter Guy Oberson.

Career
Because French was a language acquired at school and university, Huston found that the combination of her eventual command of the language and her distance from it as a non-native speaker helped her to find her literary voice. 
Since 1980, Huston has published over 45 books of fiction and non-fiction, including theatre and children's books. Some of her publications are self-translations of previously published works. Essentially she writes in French and subsequently self-translates into English but Plainsong (1993) was written first in English and then self-translated to French as Cantique des plaines (1993) – it was, however, the French version which first found a publisher.

She has 25 fiction publications, of which 13 are original fiction and 11 are self-translations.

In her fiction, only Trois fois septembre (1989), Visages de l'aube (2001) and Infrarouge (2010), as well as her three children's books, have not been published in English. She has also published two plays but has not yet translated either.

She has 14 non-fiction publications, of which 12 are original publications and two are self-translations. The other ten non-fiction publications have not yet been self-translated.

While Huston's often controversial works of non-fiction have been well-received, her fiction has earned her the most critical acclaim. Her first novel, Les variations Goldberg (1981), was awarded the Prix Contrepoint and was shortlisted for the Prix Femina. She translated this novel into English as The Goldberg Variations (1996).

Her next major award came in 1993 when she was received the Canadian Governor General's Award for Fiction in French for Cantique des Plaines (1993).  This was initially contested as it was a translation of Plainsong (1993), but Huston demonstrated that it was an adaptation and kept the prize. A subsequent novel, La virevolte (1994), won the Prix "L" and the Prix Louis-Hémon. It was published in English in 1996 as Slow Emergencies.

Huston's novel, Instruments des ténèbres, has been her most successful novel yet, being shortlisted for the Prix Femina, and the Governor General's Award. It was awarded the Prix Goncourt des Lycéens, as well as both the Prix des lectrices (Elle Québec) and the Prix du livre Inter in 1997.

In 1998, she was nominated for a Governor General's Award for her novel L'Empreinte de l'ange. The next year she was nominated for a Governor General's Award for translating the work into English as The Mark of the Angel.

In 1999, she appeared in the film Set Me Free (Emporte-moi), also collaborating on the screenplay.

Her works have been translated into many languages from Chinese to Russian.

In 2005, she was made an Officer of the Order of Canada, and she received the Prix Femina in 2006 for the novel Lignes de faille and which, as Fault Lines, has been published by Atlantic Books and is shortlisted for the 2008 Orange Prize.

Her latest novel is Infrarouge (2010).

In 2007, she received an honorary doctorate from the University of Liège.

In 2010, she received an honorary doctorate from the University of Ottawa.

In 2012, she won the Literary Review's Bad Sex in Fiction Award for her novel, Infrared.

Critical response
Canadian poet and critic Frank Davey in "Big, Bad and Little Known: The Anglophone-Canadian Nancy Huston" (2004), is critical of Huston's English writing style. In response to this misunderstanding of her style, Joseph Pivato in "Nancy Huston Meets le Nouveau Roman" (2016), points out that Huston was influenced by the French writers of le Nouveau Roman and their theory of composition. See her Nord perdu (1999).

Selected works

Fiction
 The Story of Omaya (1987) – self-translation of Histoire d'Omaya (1985)
 Trois fois septembre (1989) [no English self-translation]
 Plainsong (1993) – Cantique des plaines (self-translation) (1993)
 Slow Emergencies (1996) – self-translation of La Virevolte (1994)
 Instruments of Darkness (1997) – self-translation of Instruments des ténèbres (1996)
 The Mark of the Angel (1998) – self-translation of L'empreinte de l'ange (1988)
 Prodigy: A Novella (2000) – self-translation of Prodige : polyphonie (1999)
 Limbes/Limbo (2000) [bilingual edition]
 Visages de l'aube (2001) [with Valérie Winckler – no English version]
 Dolce Agonia (2001) – self-translation of the French version Dolce agonia (2001), cover illustration by Ralph Petty
 An Adoration (2003) – self-translation of Une adoration (2003)
 Fault Lines (2007) – self-translation of Lignes de faille (2006)
 Infrarouge (2010) – Infrared (2012)
 Danse noire* (2013) – [no English self-translation as of yet]

Theatre
 Angela et Marina (2002) [with Valérie Grail – no English self-translation]
 Jocaste reine (2009, translated as Jocasta Regina, 2010)

Non-fiction
 Jouer au papa et à l'amant  (1979) [no English self-translation]
 Dire et interdire : éléments de jurologie (1980) [no English self-translation]
 Mosaïque de la pornographie : Marie-Thérèse et les autres (1982) [no English self-translation]
 Journal de la création (1990)[no English self-translation]
 Tombeau de Romain Gary (1995) [no English self-translation]
 Pour un patriotisme de l'ambiguïté (1995) [no English self-translation]
 Nord perdu : suivi de Douze France (1999)
 Losing north: musings on land, tongue and self (2002) [self-translation of Nord perdu : suivi de Douze France]
 Professeurs de désespoir (2004) [no English self-translation]
 Passions d'Annie Leclerc (2007) [no English self-translation]
 L'espèce fabulatrice (2008)
 The Tale-Tellers: A Short Study of Humankind (2008) [self-translation of L'espèce fabulatrice]

Correspondence
 À l'amour comme à la guerre (1984) [no English version]
 Lettres parisiennes : autopsie de l'exil [with Leila Sebbar] (1986) [no English version]

Selected texts
 Désirs et réalités : textes choisis 1978–1994 (1995) [no English version]
 Âmes et corps : textes choisis 1981–2003 (2004) [no English version]

Children's fiction
 Véra veut la vérité (1992) [with Léa & Willi Glasauer – English version as "Vera learns the Truth"]
 Dora demande des détails (1997) [with Léa & Pascale Bougeault – no English version]
 Les souliers d'or (1998) [no English self-translation]

Filmography
 Stolen Life (1998) (as screenwriter)

Notes

References
 Eugene Benson and William Toye, eds. The Oxford Companion to Canadian Literature, Second Edition. Toronto: Oxford University Press, 1997: 564–565.

External links

 Nancy Huston, dea ex machina
 Nancy Huston entry at Canadian Encyclopedia
 
  Fonds Nancy Huston (R15463) at Library and Archives Canada

1953 births
Canadian women novelists
Exophonic writers
French–English translators
Governor General's Award-winning fiction writers
Living people
Officers of the Order of Canada
Prix Femina winners
Prix du Livre Inter winners
Prix Goncourt des lycéens winners
Waldorf school alumni
Writers from Calgary
Sarah Lawrence College alumni
20th-century Canadian novelists
21st-century Canadian novelists
20th-century Canadian women writers
21st-century Canadian women writers
Canadian novelists in French
20th-century Canadian translators
21st-century Canadian translators
Canadian women non-fiction writers